Formentera is a Spanish geographical indication for Vino de la Tierra wines located in Formentera in the autonomous region of the Balearic Islands, Spain. Vino de la Tierra is one step below the mainstream Denominación de Origen indication on the Spanish wine quality ladder.

The area covered by this geographical indication comprises all the municipalities of the island of Formentera. There are currently around 10 hectares of vineyards and 2 wineries (bodegas) registered with the Regulatory Council (Consejo Regulador).

It acquired its Vino de la Tierra status in 2004.

Grape varieties
 Red: Monastrell, Fogoneu, Tempranillo, Cabernet sauvignon and Merlot
 White: Malvasia, Premsal blanco, Chardonnay and Viognier

External links
 Vino de la tierra de Formentera Página del Institut de Qualitat Agroalimentaria de las Islas Baleares

Spanish wine
Wine regions of Spain
Wine-related lists
Appellations
Formentera
Balearic cuisine